Serge Yoffou (born 24 December 1971 in Abidjan) is a former Ivorian international footballer, who played in his career as a forward.

In his career Yoffou played in his country for Stella d'Adjamé and Stade d'Abidjan, in France for Dijon FCO and Paris FC, in Bulgaria for Dobrudzha Dobrich and Levski Sofia and in Switzerland for FC Baden, SR Delémont, FC Thun and CS Chênois.

Whilst at Levski Sofia, Yoffou scored memorable goals including against Juventus in the UEFA Cup in a 1–3 loss.

Honours
Levski Sofia
 Bulgarian League: 1999–2000
 Bulgarian Cup: 1999–2000

References

External links

 Profile at LevskiSofia.info

Ivorian footballers
Ivory Coast international footballers
Dijon FCO players
Paris FC players
PFC Dobrudzha Dobrich players
PFC Levski Sofia players
SR Delémont players
FC Thun players
Stade d'Abidjan players
Ligue 2 players
First Professional Football League (Bulgaria) players
Expatriate footballers in France
Expatriate footballers in Switzerland
Expatriate footballers in Bulgaria
Ivorian expatriate footballers
Association football forwards
1971 births
Living people
CS Chênois players
Footballers from Abidjan